Samakotavaripalle is a hamlet within the Agraharam village in the Nimmanapalli mandal in Chittoor district (Andhra Pradesh, India. In the 2011 census it had 109 households.

References

Villages in Chittoor district